Robert Robinson (27 March 1910 – 22 January 1989) was an English professional footballer who played as a goalkeeper for Sunderland.

References

1910 births
1989 deaths
People from County Durham (district)
Footballers from County Durham
English footballers
Association football goalkeepers
Hebburn Colliery F.C. players
Sunderland A.F.C. players
Guildford City F.C. players
Norwich City F.C. players
Barrow A.F.C. players
Scarborough F.C. players
Gainsborough Trinity F.C. players
English Football League players